Slide Show is an album by guitarist Ralph Towner and vibraphonist Gary Burton recorded in 1985 and released on the ECM label.

Reception 
The Allmusic review by awarded the album 3 stars.

Track listing 
All compositions by Ralph Towner except as indicated
 "Maelstrom" - 8:43   
 "Vessel" - 5:25   
 "Around the Bend" - 4:24   
 "Blue in Green" (Bill Evans) - 5:19   
 "Beneath an Evening Sky" - 6:26   
 "The Donkey Jamboree" - 3:57   
 "Continental Breakfast" - 3:19   
 "Charlotte's Tangle" - 4:18   
 "Innocenti" - 4:51   
Recorded at Tonstudio Bauer in Ludwigsburg, West Germany in May 1985

Personnel 
 Ralph Towner — twelve-string guitar, classical guitar
 Gary Burton — vibraphone, marimba

References 

ECM Records albums
Ralph Towner albums
Gary Burton albums
1986 albums
Albums produced by Manfred Eicher